Novopokrovka is an urban-type settlement in Chuhuiv Raion of Kharkiv Oblast in Ukraine. It is located on the left bank of the Udy, a tributary of the Donets. Novopokrovka hosts the administration of Novopokrovka settlement hromada, one of the hromadas of Ukraine. Population:

Economy

Transportation
Pokrovka railway station is located in Novopokrovka. It is on the railway connecting Kharkiv and Kupiansk. There is regular passenger traffic.

The settlement has road access to Highway M03 connecting Kharkiv and Sloviansk.

References

Urban-type settlements in Chuhuiv Raion